Clothilde de Bernardi (born 16 November 1994) is an inactive French tennis player.

De Bernardi has a career-high singles ranking of world No. 276, achieved on 8 June 2015. On 18 August 2014, she peaked at No. 436 in the WTA doubles rankings. She has won eleven singles and three doubles titles on the ITF Women's Circuit.

In May 2015, she received a wildcard to play in the French Open doubles tournament with partner Shérazad Reix. She also received a wildcard entry into the mixed doubles, partnering with Maxime Hamou.

ITF finals

Singles: 17 (11–6)

Doubles: 5 (3–2)

External links
 
 

1994 births
Living people
French female tennis players
Sportspeople from Bastia